Ringo, the Mark of Vengeance is a 1966 Italian western film directed by Mario Caiano, scored by Francesco De Masi and starring Anthony Steffen. It was shot in Almería.

Cast
 Anthony Steffen as Ringo
 Frank Wolff as Trikie Ferguson
 Eduardo Fajardo as Tim
 Armando Calvo as Fidel
 Alejandra Nilo as Manuela
 Alfonso Godá as Sheriff Sam Dellinger
 Román Ariznavarreta as Jugador
 Manuel Bermúdez 'Boliche' as Mortimer
 Agustín Bescos as Ciudadano
 Ricardo Canales as Alcalde de san agustin
 Nazzareno Natale as Paco
 Antonio Orengo as Sacerdote
 Joaquín Parra as Ayudante del sheriff
 Patty Shepard as Chica del saloon
 Amedeo Trilli as Boss of Mexican Village
 Rafael Vaquero as Hombre de Trikie

References

External links
 

Italian Western (genre) films
1966 Western (genre) films
1966 films
Films directed by Mario Caiano
Films scored by Francesco De Masi
Films shot in Almería
Films shot in Madrid
Films shot in Rome
1960s Italian films